Kaszuba may refer to:

 Kaszuba, Podlaskie Voivodeship, settlement in north-eastern Poland
 Kaszuba, Pomeranian Voivodeship, village in north-central Poland
 Kaszuba Leśna, settlement in north-central Poland
 Kaszuba (surname)

See also
 
 Kaszuby (disambiguation)